"Aslan" Nihat Asım Bekdik  (1902 – 21 June 1972) was a Turkish professional footballer. He spent the entirety of his career with his hometown club, Galatasaray. He also represented Turkey on 21 occasions, captaining them 10 times, and played for Turkey at the 1924 Summer Olympics and the 1928 Summer Olympics.

Sporting career

Football

Nihat was born in Istanbul and played his entire career as a defense player for Galatasaray SK, playing 268 games between 1916 and 1936. Like many other Galatasaray SK players at that time, he was a student of the Galatasaray High School and started playing football at the Grand Cour of the Galatasaray High School at the age of 10. He was selected to Galatasaray A2 team when he was 12. Two years later he started to do athletics for the next four years.  He won the Istanbul Football League sixth times as captain of the team in 1928 and 1936.

Other sports

He was also a very good triple jumper and high jumper. In 1923 he set new Turkish records at triple jump (11.92m) and high jump (1.58m).
After his football career he continued doing sports in equestrian, rowing and swimming.
With his Boat "Aslan" he won numerous cups.

Political career
Between 1957 and 1960 he was in the Grand National Assembly of Turkey as a member of the Democratic Party.

Aslan
Because of a lion badge at his sweat suit and his fabulous performances on the pitch, the spectators called him "Aslan" which means "Lion" in Turkish.
Later "Aslan" became the nickname of the club Galatasaray SK.

Career statistics

International goals

Honours

As player
Galatasaray SK
 Istanbul Football League: 6
1921–1922, 1924–1925, 1925–1926, 1926–1927, 1928–1929, 1930–1931
 Istanbul Cup (football): 1
1933

As manager
Galatasaray SK
 Istanbul Football League: 1
1928–1929

See also
List of one-club men

References

External links

Profile at Sports-reference

1902 births
1972 deaths
Turkish footballers
Turkey international footballers
Galatasaray S.K. footballers
Turkish male high jumpers
Turkish male triple jumpers
Turkish football managers
Galatasaray S.K. (football) managers
Footballers from Istanbul
Galatasaray High School alumni
Footballers at the 1924 Summer Olympics
Footballers at the 1928 Summer Olympics
Olympic footballers of Turkey
Galatasaray Rowing rowers
Turkish male rowers
Association football central defenders